Mark Allan Hendrickson (born June 23, 1974) is an American former baseball and basketball player. Hendrickson was a pitcher in Major League Baseball (MLB) and played power forward in the National Basketball Association (NBA) and Continental Basketball Association (CBA). He is one of just 13 athletes to play in both MLB and the NBA. He is a former pitching coach for the Aberdeen IronBirds.

Hendrickson was a ground ball pitcher, with a fastball in the high 80s and a decent 12–6 curveball. Hendrickson also had a 10–4 slider, but his slider only reached the high 70s to low 80s. Thus, when Hendrickson had success, it was due to control, movement, and location and not power.

High school career
Hendrickson was a three-sport standout in tennis, basketball, and baseball at Mount Vernon High School in the state of Washington. During his sophomore year, he was a member of the state championship baseball team and the runner-up state basketball team. He was a member of the state championship basketball team during his junior year, where he earned recognition as the co-MVP of the tournament for his play. He was also named team captain, team MVP, and named to the All-Area and All-State teams. A tennis state qualifier, Hendrickson was also named to the baseball All-Area team.

As a senior, Hendrickson led the Bulldogs to a second basketball championship. He was team captain, team MVP, All-Area, All-State, and the state basketball tournament MVP. For his performance on the basketball court, he was named the Gatorade State Player of the Year. In addition to his remarkable basketball play, he was able to help his team win the state championship in baseball, while also qualifying for state in tennis. He was named the Skagit Valley Herald Athlete of the Year both his junior and senior years.

College career
Hendrickson starred in both basketball and baseball at Washington State University.

In basketball, he was a two-time selection to the All-Pac-10 first team and he ranks second in Washington State history in rebounds. He averaged 13.9 points per game and 8.6 rebounds per game during his four years at Washington State. He was also selected to All-Conference teams in baseball.

NBA and MLB drafts
The first time Hendrickson was drafted by a baseball team was right after high school when he was selected in the 13th round of the 1992 draft by the Atlanta Braves, but chose to attend college instead. He was also drafted, but did not sign, by the San Diego Padres in the 21st round of the 1993 draft, by the Atlanta Braves again in the 32nd round of the 1994 draft, by the Detroit Tigers in the 16th round of the 1995 draft, and by the Texas Rangers in the 19th round of the 1996 draft.

Upon his college graduation he was selected by the NBA's Philadelphia 76ers (31st overall pick) of the 1996 draft and MLB's Toronto Blue Jays (20th round) of the 1997 draft.

Professional basketball career
Hendrickson elected to play basketball and joined the Philadelphia 76ers, playing in 29 games in the 1996–97 NBA season, averaging 2.9 points and 3.2 rebounds in 10.4 minutes per game. He signed as a free agent with the Sacramento Kings on December 23, 1997, appearing in 48 games, averaging 15.4 minutes, 3.4 points and 3.0 rebounds as a reserve player.

Unsigned by the NBA prior to the 1998 season, he signed with the La Crosse Bobcats of the Continental Basketball Association (CBA) where he played most of the season. He was picked up by the New Jersey Nets for a couple of brief stints during the 1998–99 and 1999–2000 seasons and by the Cleveland Cavaliers for the 1999–2000 season. Frustrated by his inability to get more consistent work, he decided to give up on basketball and concentrate on baseball.

During his NBA career Hendrickson appeared in 114 games, and recorded 381 points and 316 rebounds.

Minor league baseball career
He continued to play semi-pro baseball in the offseason (in York, Pennsylvania) while he was playing basketball and eventually signed with the Blue Jays on May 22, 1998, electing to play minor league baseball during the summer while continuing his basketball career. During this period, he pitched for the Blue Jays Single-A affiliate in Dunedin in 1998 (4–3, 2.37 ERA, 16 games, 5 starts) and the Double-A Smokies in 1999 (2–7, 6.63 ERA, 12 games, 11 starts).

In 2000, after abandoning basketball and turning to baseball full-time, he had to refocus his energies on his baseball career. "I was always around baseball," he commented, "but what a lot of people don't realize, and what I didn't realize is that I didn't put in the time and dedication into knowing how to get my arm into shape, how to take care of it, and how to pitch on a regular basis."

He started off the 2000 season back at Dunedin (2–2, 5.61 ERA, 12 starts, one complete game), but was promoted to the Double-A Tennessee Smokies (3–1, 3.63 ERA, six starts). He spent the next two seasons with the Triple-A SkyChiefs (2–9, 4.66 ERA, 38 games, six starts in 2001; 7–5, 3.52 ERA, 14 starts in 2002).

Major League Baseball career

Toronto Blue Jays
Hendrickson made his major league debut for the Blue Jays on August 6, 2002, against the Seattle Mariners as a reliever. It was a rather bleak first appearance. He worked  of an inning and allowed 5 runs. The Jays stuck with him and he made his first career start on September 7 against the Boston Red Sox, pitching 5 scoreless innings in a game the Jays lost 4–1. His first victory came in his next start, on September 14 against the Tampa Bay Devil Rays, when he worked six innings, allowed one run and the Jays won 8–4.

He returned to the rotation at the start of the 2003 season and stayed there all year, accumulating a 9–9 record with a 5.51 ERA in 30 starts, with one complete game shutout. Hendrickson is the first pitcher in Toronto Blue Jays history to hit a home run, which he did against the Montreal Expos on June 21, 2003.

Tampa Bay Devil Rays
On December 14, 2003, he was traded by the Blue Jays along with Sandy Nin to the Colorado Rockies for Justin Speier. The Rockies immediately flipped him to the Tampa Bay Devil Rays for Joe Kennedy. He became a regular member of the Devil Rays' rotation, accumulating records of 10–15 (4.81 ERA) in 2004, 11–8 (5.90 ERA) in 2005, and 4–8 (3.81 ERA) in the first half of 2006.

Los Angeles Dodgers
He was traded to the Los Angeles Dodgers on June 27, 2006, along with catcher Toby Hall in exchange for Dioner Navarro, Jae Weong Seo and minor league outfielder Justin Ruggiano. He immediately joined the Dodgers' starting rotation, but ineffectiveness caused him to be moved to the bullpen for the end of the season, where he was more effective. His final 2006 numbers with the Dodgers were 2–7, 4.68 ERA in 18 appearances, 12 as a starter. In 2007, he was both a starter and a reliever for the Dodgers, showing more effectiveness out of the bullpen. Hendrickson was not offered a contract by the Dodgers and became a free agent on December 12, 2007.

Florida Marlins

On January 16, 2008, Hendrickson signed a one-year, $1.5 million contract with the Florida Marlins. On June 9, 2008, Ken Griffey Jr. hit the 600th home run of his career off a fastball thrown by Hendrickson in the 1st inning of a 9–4 loss to the Cincinnati Reds.

On July 7, the Marlins announced that Hendrickson, along with Ryan Tucker, would be moved to the bullpen to make room in the rotation for Josh Johnson and Chris Volstad.

Baltimore Orioles
On December 31, 2008, Hendrickson signed a one-year deal for the 2009 season with the Baltimore Orioles. He was re-signed for the 2010 season. While with the Orioles, Hendrickson was mostly a relief pitcher, but he made a few starts. On September 11, 2009, he picked up his only major league save by throwing three shutout innings against the New York Yankees. He saved the win for starting pitcher Chris Tillman. The Orioles declined his option for the 2011 season, making him a free agent. However, he later agreed to a minor league deal with the Orioles. This deal included an invitation to big league spring training. In February 2013, he returned to the Orioles organization on a minor league contract.

Hendrickson retired from baseball on March 31, 2015.

Hendrickson is one of 13 athletes that played in both the National Basketball Association and Major League Baseball. The 13 are: Danny Ainge, Frank Baumholtz, Hank Biasatti, Gene Conley, Chuck Connors, Dave DeBusschere, Dick Groat, Steve Hamilton, Hendrickson, Cotton Nash, Ron Reed, Dick Ricketts and Howie Schultz.

Pitching style
Hendrickson threw four pitches: a four-seam fastball, a curveball, a changeup, as well as a cutter. His fastball varied from 87 to 91 MPH. Hendrickson's curveball had little movement, and sits around 71–76 MPH. His changeup was not very effective, as the 82–84 MPH velocity did not differ enough from his fastball. Hendrickson's cutter was his best pitch and it sat around 82–87 MPH.

Baseball coaching career
Hendrickson was announced as the Aberdeen IronBirds' new pitching coach on February 27, 2017.

References

External links

1974 births
Living people
American expatriate baseball players in Canada
American men's basketball players
Baltimore Orioles players
Baseball players from Washington (state)
Basketball players from Washington (state)
Cleveland Cavaliers players
Dunedin Blue Jays players
Florida Marlins players
Knoxville Smokies players
La Crosse Bobcats players
Los Angeles Dodgers players
Major League Baseball pitchers
New Jersey Nets players
Norfolk Tides players
People from Mount Vernon, Washington
Philadelphia 76ers draft picks
Philadelphia 76ers players
Power forwards (basketball)
Sacramento Kings players
Syracuse SkyChiefs players
Tampa Bay Devil Rays players
Tennessee Smokies players
Toronto Blue Jays players
Washington State Cougars baseball players
Washington State Cougars men's basketball players
York Revolution players